The Former Abattoirs or the Former Slaughterhouses of Casablanca were constructed under the French protectorate in Morocco in 1912 in the neighborhood of Hay Mohammadi in Casablanca.

History 
The one-time slaughterhouses of Casablanca were constructed by architect George-Ernest Desmarest in 1912 and modernized in 1922 by Henri Prost.

They were expanded in 1951, then closed in 2002, substituted by new slaughterhouses in the periphery of Casablanca.

Abandoned since 2002, the approximately 14 acre complex became host to a public art movement, with free performances, workshops, and concerts. Theatre Nomade is still based there.

Architecture 
The Former Abattoirs were built in a style inspired by Neo-Mauresque, or Moorish Revival, as well as Art Deco.

References

Further reading 
L'Batwar - Fabrique culturelle des Abattoirs de Casablanca - Histoire d'une reconversion. Jean-Louis Cohen, Najib Taki, Driss Ksikes. Sirocco. 2014. 978-9954-32-955-9.

Buildings and structures in Casablanca